Are You Smarter than a 10 Year Old? may refer to:

 Are You Smarter than a 10 Year Old? (British game show)
 Are You Smarter than a 10 Year Old? (New Zealand game show)

See also
 Are You Smarter than a 5th Grader?, game show franchise